The 2013 Samarkand Challenger was a professional tennis tournament played on clay courts. It was the 17th edition of the tournament which was part of the 2013 ATP Challenger Tour. It took place in Samarkand, Uzbekistan between 13 and 19 May 2013.

Singles main draw entrants

Seeds

 1 Rankings are as of May 6, 2013.

Other entrants
The following players received wildcards into the singles main draw:
  Sarvar Ikramov
  Temur Ismailov
  Sergey Shipilov
  Vaja Uzakov

The following player received entry using a protected ranking:
  Pere Riba

The following players received entry from the qualifying draw:
  Sergey Betov
  Aliaksandr Bury
  Alexander Kudryavtsev
  Denys Molchanov

Doubles main draw entrants

Seeds

 1 Rankings are as of May 6, 2013.

Other entrants
The following pairs received wildcards into the doubles main draw:
  Sanjar Fayziev /  Shonigmatjon Shofayziyev
  Sarvar Ikramov /  Vaja Uzakov
  Temur Ismailov /  Sergey Shipilov

The following pair received entry using a protected ranking:
  Guillermo Olaso /  Pere Riba

Champions

Singles

 Teymuraz Gabashvili def.  Oleksandr Nedovyesov, 6–3, 6–4

Doubles

 Farrukh Dustov /  Oleksandr Nedovyesov def.  Radu Albot /  Jordan Kerr, 6–1, 7–6(9–7)

External links
Official Website

Samarkand Challenger
Samarkand Challenger
2013 in Uzbekistani sport
May 2013 sports events in Asia